"Liekeissä" is a song by Finnish rapper Cheek. Released on 16 April 2008, the song serves as the first single from Cheek's fourth studio album Kuka sä oot. "Liekeissä" peaked at number one on the Finnish Singles Chart.

Chart performance

References

2008 singles
2008 songs
Cheek (rapper) songs
Number-one singles in Finland